James Ritchie Norris (born 29 August 1960) is a mathematician working in probability theory and stochastic analysis. He is the Professor of Stochastic Analysis in the Statistical Laboratory, University of Cambridge.

He has made contributions to areas of mathematics connected to probability theory and mathematical analysis, including Malliavin calculus, heat kernel estimates, and mathematical models for coagulation and fragmentation. He was awarded the Rollo Davidson Prize in 1997.

Norris was an undergraduate at Hertford College, Oxford where he graduated in 1981. He completed his D.Phil in 1985 at Wolfson College, Oxford under the supervision of David Edwards. He was a Research Assistant from 1984–1985 at the University College of Swansea before moving in 1985 to a Lectureship at Cambridge University and a Fellowship of Churchill College, Cambridge. He was appointed  Professor of Stochastic Analysis in 2005. He is the Director of the Statistical Laboratory, a trustee of the Rollo Davidson Trust and co-Director of the Cambridge Centre for Analysis.

Selected publication

References

20th-century English mathematicians
Alumni of Hertford College, Oxford
Alumni of Wolfson College, Oxford
21st-century English mathematicians
Fellows of Churchill College, Cambridge
1960 births
Living people
Cambridge mathematicians
Probability theorists